Back to Babylon is the first album by the band Tormé and was released in 1985. The cover was designed by Lisa Valder.  It was re-issued on CD by Metal Blade Records in 1989 with "Love, Guns And Money" added.  In 2004 it was re-issued again on Lemon Recordings with three bonus tracks: "T.V.O.D.", "Kerrap" and "Love, Guns And Money".

Track listing
All tracks composed by Bernie Tormé; except where indicated

Side one
 "All Around The World" (Tormé, Heilman, Whitewood, Lewis) - 3:52
 "Star" - 4:35
 "Eyes of the World" - 4:39
 "Burning Bridges" - 2:15
 "Hardcore" (Tormé, Heilman, Whitewood, Lewis) - 3:17
 "Here I Go" - 2:30

Side two
 "Family At War" (Phil Lewis, Pete Bonus) (Girl cover) - 4:56
 "Front Line" - 5:34
 "Arabia" - 4:59
 "Mystery Train" - 5:52

2004 CD release
For the 2004 CD release three tracks from the 1986 "So You Wanna Be A Star" EP were added.

 "All Around The World" (Tormé, Heilman, Whitewood, Lewis) - 3:52
 "Star" - 4:35
 "Eyes of the World" - 4:39
 "Burning Bridges" - 2:15
 "Hardcore" (Tormé, Heilman, Whitewood, Lewis) - 3:17
 "Here I Go" - 2:30
 "Family At War" (Phil Lewis, Pete Bonus) (Girl cover) - 4:56
 "Front Line" - 5:34
 "Arabia" - 4:59
 "Mystery Train" - 5:52
 "T.V.O.D." (Heilman) - 1:58
 "Kerrap" - 1:12
 "Love, Guns, and Money" - 3:00

Personnel
 Phil Lewis - lead vocals
 Bernie Tormé - guitar
 Chris Heilman - bass
 Ian Whitewood - drums
 Special guest - Colin Towns - keyboards

References

Tormé albums
1985 debut albums